Noël Mailloux, OC (21 December 1909 - 21 January 1997) was a Canadian psychologist,  President of the Canadian Psychological Association.

Career
Noël Mailloux was born in Napierville, Quebec in 1913. He was ordained a Dominican priest in 1937. He began teaching psychology at the University of Ottawa in 1939. In 1942, he was asked to establish a Department of Psychology at the University of Montreal where he remained until 1975, including 19 years as head of department.

Mailloux was active in the Canadian Psychological Association being elected president in 1963. He died in Quebec in 1997.

Positions
 1963: President, Quebec Psychological Association
 1963: President, Canadian Psychological Association

Awards
Awards and honours include:
 1955 - Fellow, Canadian Psychological Association
 1963 - Fellow, Royal Society of Canada
 1966 - Léo-Pariseau Prize
 1975 - Innis-Gérin Medal
 1979 - Prix Léon-Gérin
 1984 - William James Award, American Psychological Association

References

Canadian psychologists
20th-century psychologists
1909 births
1997 deaths
Academic staff of the Université de Montréal
Fellows of the Royal Society of Canada
Presidents of the Canadian Psychological Association
Officers of the Order of Canada